Thomas Scudder Page (April 19, 1800 – April 17, 1877) was Kentucky's first elected auditor of public accounts, and the first elected official to be tried for corruption in that state. He was born in New York City and came to Kentucky in 1817. He became a clerk with the Land Office and in 1839 was appointed state auditor by Governor James Clark.

Under Kentucky's third constitution, auditor became an elected position. Page was elected to the position in 1851 as a Whig and in 1855 with the Know Nothing party. He required some official collectors of funds to deposit their collections with him, rather than the state treasurer directly, and in 1859 was sued by the state for embezzling $88,927 (embezzlement was not a criminal offense at the time).

Page declared bankruptcy in 1863 and in 1867 was ordered by the legislature to repay the state $88,000, plus interest and court costs. He lived the remaining 10 years of his life in destitution in Frankfort, and was buried in Frankfort Cemetery.

References

External links

1800 births
1877 deaths
Burials at Frankfort Cemetery
Kentucky Whigs
19th-century American politicians
Politicians from New York City
Kentucky Know Nothings
Politicians convicted of embezzlement
American politicians convicted of corruption